Dallas Brooks Hall was an Australian events venue in East Melbourne, Victoria. Built in 1969, the building was named after  the 19th Governor of Victoria, Dallas Brooks. It was designed by the architecture firm Godfrey and Spowers. 
It was later renamed the "Dallas Brooks Centre".

In 2015, Victorian state government approval was given to demolish the hall and build residential apartments in its place. There was some controversy about the height of the apartment residential development built on the site.

Events held at the venue

Music
Musicians who played at the Dallas Brooks Hall include: Tom Waits, Dutch fusion band Focus supported by a local band Sebastian Hardy, Rory Gallagher, Ravi Shankar, Talking Heads (first Australian tour), John Cale and Jonathan Richman (August 27, 1983), blues duo Brownie McGhee & Sonny Terry, country outlaw Jerry Jeff Walker (on 13 and 15 May 1981), country singer Crystal Gayle, McGuinn Clark and Hillman (Byrds), Rosanne Cash with Lucinda Williams, and Mary Chapin Carpenter.

Politics
Malcolm Fraser started the Liberal Party of Australia's campaign for the 1975 Australian federal election with a speech at the Dallas Brooks Hall.

References

Music venues in Melbourne
East Melbourne, Victoria
Taekwondo venues
Demolished buildings and structures in Melbourne
Buildings and structures completed in 1969
Buildings and structures demolished in 2015
1969 establishments in Australia
2015 disestablishments in Australia